Limeulia cimoliochroa is a species of moth of the family Tortricidae. It is found in Minas Gerais, Brazil.

The wingspan is about 10 mm. The ground colour of the forewings is pale ferruginous cream, but whiter in the basal half of the costal area. The dots and markings are black. The hindwings are whitish grey, but transparent and grey posteriorly.

Etymology
The specific name refers to the colouration of the forewing ground colour and is derived from Greek Kimolos (the island providing clay and indirectly meaning clay colour) and pteron (meaning wing).

References

Moths described in 2011
Euliini
Moths of South America
Taxa named by Józef Razowski